École secondaire Chavigny is a French-language high school in Trois-Rivières, Quebec, Canada which is operated by the Centre de service scolaire du Chemin-du-Roy.

The school's principal is Jean-François Bédard. The school has a strong theatre department.

References

External links
 École secondaire Chavigny

High schools in Quebec
Schools in Trois-Rivières